Sri Lanka took part in the 2017 Asian Winter Games in Sapporo and Obihiro, Japan from February 19 to 26. This marks the country's official debut at the Asian Winter Games and a global Winter sporting event. The country is scheduled to compete with five athletes in one sport (three disciplines). The team will also consist of two officials and a chef de mission. The chef de mission of the team is Gihan Dalpathdo, the secretary general of Winter Sport Association of Sri Lanka.

Competitors
The following table lists the Sri Lankan delegation per sport and gender.

Alpine skiing

Sri Lanka is scheduled to enter one male alpine skier.

Men
Seshaan Gardiner

Cross-country skiing

Sri Lanka is scheduled to enter one male cross-country skier. Sajeev de Silva is a former rower who competed for the country at the 2010 Asian Games in Guangzhou, China, he later switched to archery and was part of the silver medal-winning team at the 2016 South Asian Games in Guwahati, India. On the other hand, Lukas Hettiarachchi won a gold medal in the beginners category during the dream program run by the organizing committee of the 2018 Winter Olympics.

Man
Lukas Hettiarachchi
Sajeev de Silva
Shehan Muthugala

Snowboarding

Sri Lanka entered one female snowboarder. Azquiya Usuph is a two time gold medalist as part of the dream program. Usuph competed in the giant slalom event and was disqualified after missing a gate.

Woman

References

Nations at the 2017 Asian Winter Games
Asian Winter Games
Sri Lanka at the Asian Winter Games